The 1976–77  Gonzaga Bulldogs men's basketball team represented Gonzaga University during the 1976–77 NCAA Division I basketball season. Members of the Big Sky Conference, the Bulldogs were led by 
fifth-year head coach Adrian Buoncristiani and played their home games on campus at Kennedy Pavilion in Spokane, Washington.

Gonzaga was third in the regular season standings and qualified for the four-team conference tournament, hosted by Idaho State in Pocatello. The Bulldogs lost by a point in the semifinals to favored  ISU won the tournament and advanced to the NCAA Tournament's Elite Eight, upsetting #2 UCLA in the Sweet Sixteen. It remains the best-ever showing in the NCAA tournament by a Big Sky team.

This was the Zags' sole appearance in the postseason while in the Big Sky, narrowly missing the next two conference tournaments. They joined the West Coast Athletic Conference (WCAC, now WCC) in the summer of 1979, and its tourney debuted in 1987.

Senior forward Jim Grady was on the all-conference team, and center Willie Moss was honorable mention.

Postseason result

|-
!colspan=9 style=| Big Sky tournament

References

External links
Sports Reference – Gonzaga Bulldogs: 1976–77 basketball season

Gonzaga Bulldogs men's basketball seasons
Gonzaga